Gregoretti is a name of Italian origin. Notable persone with this name include:
 Lucio Gregoretti, an Italian composer
 Ugo Gregoretti, an Italian film, television and stage director, actor, screenwriter, author and television host
 Bruno Gregoretti (CP920), multipurpose vessel built for the Italian Coast Guard as an offshore patrol vessel